Melakasakudy is a revenue village in the Karaikal taluk of Puducherry District. It is situated to the west of Karaikal town.

References 

 

Villages in Karaikal district